The Monastery of Comendadoras Canonesas del Santo Sepulcro (Spanish: Monasterio de Comendadoras Canonesas del Santo Sepulcro) is a monastery located in Zaragoza, Spain. It was declared Bien de Interés Cultural in 1893.

References

See also 

 List of Bien de Interés Cultural in the Province of Zaragoza

Roman Catholic churches in Zaragoza
Monasteries in Aragon
Bien de Interés Cultural landmarks in the Province of Zaragoza